Soul Serenade is the fourth studio album by American jam band The Derek Trucks Band, released in 2003. Soul Serenade may also be considered the band's third album, as it was recorded in its entirety before Joyful Noise, but was held up in legalities, and therefore released later.

Soul Serenade continues this band's exploration of genre ambiguity. Refusing to be tied to a single genre (Blues, specifically) alienated some fans, but has allowed Trucks and his band to express themselves creatively in ways that would not be possible if confined to a single genre. Increasingly, the band, with a blues base, embraces world music. This album was released as an Enhanced CD, and contains six QuickTime-format interview clips with Trucks.

Reception

In a review for AllMusic, Robert L. Doerschuk wrote: "By almost any measure, this is a jazz album; the only references to rock can be heard in the overdriven tone and bluesy slide phrasing that Trucks consistently employs... The rhythm feel is subtle... with an understated swing that borrows from this or that corner of world music but unmistakably centers itself on jazz practice."

Justin Cober-Lake of PopMatters stated: "Each musician in the band is supremely talented and a large part of the band's success is due to the members' willingness to share time at the front of the sound... the album contains no filler... Although the individual artists may not have sought attention on Soul Serenade, the Derek Trucks Band deserves to be noticed."

Writing for JazzTimes, Brian Gilmore commented: "It won't matter how this album is classified... because it has it all... the Derek Trucks Band is hitting on all cylinders from start to finish... [the] band stays tight and focused at all times, letting the guitarist roam where he needs."

In an article for All About Jazz, C. Michael Bailey remarked: "Derek Trucks may safely be considered the logical extension of the art of Duane Allman without simply being an imitation... the guitarist proves himself a clever and capable leader, not afraid to visit new or old themes."

Billboard's Philip van Vleck noted that the tunes on the album "evince Trucks' continuing gravitation toward jazz in particular and eclecticism in general," and called his guitar work "adventuresome and powerful." He wrote: "He may be associated with the Allman Brothers Band, but when Trucks works with his group, Pat Metheny may be a more relevant reference."

Author Alan Paul called Gregg Allman's performance on "Drown in My Own Tears" "one of his best vocal tracks of the new millennium."

Track listing

Enhanced CD interview tracks

Personnel
Derek Trucks - guitar, sarod
Todd Smallie - Bass guitar
Yonrico Scott - drums, percussion
Kofi Burbridge - flute, clavinet, Fender Rhodes Piano, keyboards

Additional personnel
Bill McKay - Hammond B-3 organ, Wurlitzer Piano, keyboards
Gregg Allman - vocals (on track 3)
John Snyder - producer
Derek Trucks - producer
Tony Daigle - engineer
Robert Willis - engineer for Gregg Allman
Jim Mageras - mastering
Josh Cheuse - art direction and design
William Eggleston - cover photo
Chris Floyd - other photos
Josh Cheuse - other photos
Martin Shulman - interview, videography and editing
Joe Capone - interviewer
Wayne Forte - booking
Blake Budney - management
Marty Wall, Joe Main - crew

Charts

References

Derek Trucks albums
2003 albums
Columbia Records albums